Waqas Khan (born 10 March 1999) is a Hong Kong cricketer. He made his Twenty20 International (T20I) debut for Hong Kong against Nepal in Sri Lanka on 24 November 2014. At the age of 15 years and 259 days, he became the youngest person to play in a T20I match. He made his One Day International (ODI) debut for Hong Kong against the United Arab Emirates in the 2015–17 ICC World Cricket League Championship on 18 November 2015. He made his first-class cricket debut against Ireland in the 2015–17 ICC Intercontinental Cup on 30 August 2016.

In August 2018, he was named in Hong Kong's squad for the 2018 Asia Cup Qualifier tournament. Hong Kong won the qualifier tournament, and he was then named in Hong Kong's squad for the 2018 Asia Cup.

In December 2018, he was named in Hong Kong's team for the 2018 ACC Emerging Teams Asia Cup. In September 2019, he was named in Hong Kong's squad for the 2019 ICC T20 World Cup Qualifier tournament in the United Arab Emirates.

References

External links
 

1999 births
Living people
Hong Kong cricketers
Hong Kong One Day International cricketers
Hong Kong Twenty20 International cricketers
Place of birth missing (living people)